Waterloo is a small hamlet to the east of Caerphilly, Wales, in the community of Rudry.

History and amenities 
Whilst there is only a selection of houses, there was at one time a large tin plate works which, amongst other items, made equipment for the aviation industry (there was an aircraft works at Machen, next to the foundry which was just above the Royal Oak area in Machen) and to support various other enterprises in the area. The tinplate works closed around 1943.

Also sited at Waterloo was the Coates Brothers Paint works which was, together with the colliery, one of the biggest employers in the area. The company was later devolved to making inks etc., and closed in the late 1990s. The site was undergoing planning permission to become a housing estate but this was rejected by Caerphilly Borough County Council in 2019.  As at 2021 no planning application exists.

A Green Plaque was erected to mark the hamlet as the birthplace of Dr William Price who spent his childhood in Waterloo.  The area at the time was known as part of Rudry. 

Villages in Caerphilly County Borough